Oglesby is a surname, a variant of Ogilvy. It can refer to:

People
 Arthur Oglesby (1923–2000), British fisherman, writer and broadcaster
 Carl Oglesby (1935–2011), president of Students for a Democratic Society, 1965-1966
 Cedric Oglesby (born 1977), American football player
 John G. Oglesby (1873–1938), lieutenant governor of Illinois
 Paul Oglesby (1939–1994), American football player
 Randy Oglesby, actor
 Richard J. Oglesby (1824–1899), governor of Illinois
 Terrence Oglesby (born 1988), American professional basketball player
 Woodson R. Oglesby (1867–1955), US congressman from New York

Places

United States
 Oglesby, Illinois
 Oglesby, Texas
 Oglesby, Oklahoma
 Oglesby, Georgia

Music
 Oglesby, a contemporary Christian band